The following is a list of Lord Chancellors and Lord Keepers of the Great Seal of England and Great Britain. It also includes a list of Commissioners of Parliament's Great Seal during the English Civil War and Interregnum.

Lord Chancellors and Lord Keepers of England, 1050–1707

11th century
Regenbald (1050–after 1066)
Herfast (1068–1070)
Saint Osmund, count of Sées and bishop of Salisbury (c. 1070)
Maurice, Archdeacon of Le Mans (c. 1078)
Gerard, Preceptor of Rouen (c. 1085–before 1091), later Archbishop of York
Robert Bloet (after January 1091)
William Giffard (1094–1101)

12th century
Roger of Salisbury (1101–1102)
Waldric (1102–1107)
Ranulf (1107–1123)
Geoffrey Rufus (1123–1133)
Robert de Sigello (1133–1135) (Keeper of the Great Seal)
Roger le Poer (1135–1139)
Philip de Harcourt, Dean of Lincoln (1139–1140)
Robert of Ghent, Dean of York (1140–1141)
William FitzGilbert (1141–1142)
Robert of Ghent, Dean of York (1142–1154)
Thomas Becket, Archdeacon of Canterbury (1155–1162) Later Archbishop of Canterbury (1162-1170)
Geoffrey Ridel, Archdeacon of Canterbury (1162–1173)
Ralph de Warneville, Treasurer of York (1173–1181)
Geoffrey, the Bastard, Plantagenet (1181–1189)
William Longchamp, Bishop of Ely (1189–1197)
Eustace, Dean of Salisbury (1197–1199) (Keeper of the Great Seal)
Eustace, Dean of Salisbury (1198–1199)

13th century
Hubert Walter, Archbishop of Canterbury (1199–1205)
Walter de Gray ?"Bishop of Lichfield"?, 1214–15 Bishop of Worcester, from 1215 Archbishop of York (1205–1214)
Richard Marsh (1214–1226), from 1217 Bishop of Durham
Ralph Neville, Bishop of Chichester (1226–1240)
Richard le Gras, Abbot of Evesham (1240–1242)
Ralph Neville, Bishop of Chichester (1242–1244)
Silvester de Everdon, Archdeacon of Chester (1244–1246) (Keeper of the Great Seal)
John Maunsell, Provost of Beverley (1246–1247) (Keeper of the Great Seal)
John Lexington (1247–1248) (Keeper of the Great Seal)
John Maunsell (1248–1249) (Keeper of the Great Seal)
John Lexington (1249–1253) (Keeper of the Great Seal)
Eleanor of Provence, Queen Consort and Regent of England (1253–1254) (Keeper of the Great Seal)
William of Kilkenny (1254–1255) (Keeper of the Great Seal)
Henry Wingham (1255–1260), from 1259/1260 Bishop of London
Nicholas of Ely, Archdeacon of Ely (1260–1261)
Walter de Merton, Archdeacon of Bath (1261–1263)
Nicholas of Ely, Archdeacon of Ely (1263)
John Chishull, Archdeacon of London (1263–1264)
Thomas Cantilupe, Archdeacon of Stafford (1264–1265)
Ralph Sandwich (1265) (Keeper of the Great Seal)
Walter Giffard, Bishop of Bath and Wells (1265–1266)
Godfrey Giffard, Archdeacon of Wells (1266–1268)
John Chishull, Dean of St Paul's (1268–1269)
Richard Middleton, Archdeacon of Northumberland (1269–1272)
Walter de Merton, Archdeacon of Bath (1272–1274)
Robert Burnell, Bishop of Bath (1274–1292)
Thomas Bek, Archdeacon of Dorset (1279) (Keeper of the Great Seal)
John Langton, Canon of Lincoln (1292–1302)

14th century
William Greenfield, Dean of Chichester (1302–1305)
William Hamilton, Dean of York (1305–1307)
Ralph Baldock, Bishop of London (1307)
John Langton, Bishop of Chichester (1307–1310)
Walter Reynolds, Bishop of Worcester (1310–1314)
John Sandale, Canon of Lincoln (1314–1318)
John Hotham, Bishop of Ely (1318–1320)
John Salmon, Bishop of Norwich (1320–1323)
Robert Baldock, Archdeacon of Middlesex (1323–1326)
William Ayermin, Bishop of Norwich (1326–1327)
John Hotham, Bishop of Ely (1327–1328)
Henry Burghersh, Bishop of Lincoln (1328–1330)
John de Stratford, Bishop of Winchester (1330–1334)
Richard Bury, Bishop of Durham (1334–1335)
John de Stratford, Archbishop of Canterbury (1335–1337)
Robert de Stratford, Bishop of Chichester (1337–1338)
Richard Bintworth, Bishop of London (1338–1339)
John de Stratford, Archbishop of Canterbury (1340)
Robert de Stratford, Bishop of Chichester (1340)
Robert Bourchier, 1st Baron Bourchier (1340–1341)
Robert Parning (1341–1343)
Robert Sadington (1343–1345)
John de Ufford, Dean of Lincoln (1345–1349)
John Thoresby, Bishop of Worcester (1349–1356)
William Edington, Bishop of Winchester (1356–1363)
Simon Langham, Bishop of Ely (1363–1367)
William of Wykeham, Bishop of Winchester (1367–1371)
Robert Thorpe (1371–1372)
John Knyvet (1372–1377)
Adam Houghton, Bishop of St David's (1377–1378)
Lord Scrope of Bolton (1378–1380)
Simon Sudbury, Archbishop of Canterbury (1380–1381)
Hugh Segrave (1381) (Keeper of the Great Seal)
William Courtenay, Bishop of London (1381)
Lord Scrope of Bolton (1381–1382)
Robert Braybrooke, Bishop of London (1382–1383)
Lord de la Pole (later Earl of Suffolk) (1383–1386)
Thomas Arundel, Bishop of Ely (1386–1389)
William of Wykeham, Bishop of Winchester (1389–1391)
Thomas Arundel, Archbishop of York (1391–1396)
Edmund Stafford, Bishop of Exeter (1396–1399)
Thomas Arundel, Archbishop of Canterbury (1399)

15th century
John Scarle, Archdeacon of Lincoln (1399–1401)
Edmund Stafford, Bishop of Exeter (1401–1403)
Henry Beaufort, Bishop of Lincoln (1403–1405)
Thomas Langley, Dean of York (1405–1407)
Thomas Arundel, Archbishop of Canterbury (1407–1410)
Thomas Beaufort (1410–1412)
Thomas Arundel, Archbishop of Canterbury (1412–1413)
Henry Beaufort, Bishop of Winchester (1413–1417)
Thomas Langley, Bishop of Durham (1417–1424)
Henry Beaufort, Bishop of Winchester (1424–1426)
John Kemp, Archbishop of York (1426–1432)
John Stafford, Bishop of Bath (later Archbishop of Canterbury) (1432–1450)
John Kemp, Archbishop of York (1450–1454)
Richard Neville, 5th Earl of Salisbury (1454–1455)
Thomas Bourchier, Archbishop of Canterbury (1455–1456)
William Waynflete, Bishop of Winchester (1456–1460)
George Neville, Bishop of Exeter (1460–1467)
Robert Stillington, Bishop of Bath (1467–1470)
George Neville, Archbishop of York (1470–1471)
Robert Stillington, Bishop of Bath (1471–1473)
Laurence Booth, Bishop of Durham (1473–1474)
John Alcock, Bishop of Rochester (1475), (Keeper of the Great Seal)
Thomas Rotheram, Bishop of Lincoln (1475–1483)
John Russell, Bishop of Lincoln (1483–1485)
Thomas Rotheram, Archbishop of York (1485)
John Alcock, Bishop of Worcester (1485–1486)
John Morton, Cardinal Archbishop of Canterbury (1486–1500)

1500–1654

The Great Seal was captured and destroyed by Parliament on 11 August 1646

Commissioners of Parliament's Great Seal 1643–1660

From the Restoration, 1660, to the Act of Union, 1707

Lord High Chancellors and Lord Keepers of Great Britain (1707–present)

Notes

References

Sources
John Haydn and Horace Ockerby, The Book of Dignities, third edition, W.H. Allen and Co. Ltd, London 1894, reprinted Firecrest Publishing Limited, Bath 1969, p. 352–358
John Lord Campbell (1845) Lives of the Lords Chancellors and Keepers of the Great Seal of England. 5th ed. (1868) London: Murray, vol. 10

External links
Department for Constitutional Affairs' list

Lists of office-holders in the United Kingdom
Lord Chancellors of England
Lord Chancellors of Great Britain
United Kingdom, Lord Chancellors and Lord Keepers
Lists of chairs of upper houses

sv:Lordkansler#Lista över Englands och Storbritanniens lordkanslerer och storsigillbevarare